The Hungry River flows in western North Carolina, United States. It arises in eastern Henderson County and flows southwesterly, its entire course within Henderson County, before it empties into the Green River.  In 1904, the first hydroelectric plant in Henderson County was built on the river, and, in 1913, a second dam was built half a mile downstream for the same purpose.  Both dams stand to his day, though they are currently inoperable and slated for removal under management of the North Carolina Wildlife Resources Commission.

References

Rivers of Henderson County, North Carolina
Rivers of North Carolina